John Furniss may refer to:
John Furniss (priest) (1809–1865), English Roman Catholic priest
John Furniss (costume designer) (born 1935), British costume designer
John Brian Furniss (1934–2013), English cricketer
Jack Furniss (John Kitchener Furniss, 1914–2003), Australian rules footballer